The Bezirk Rostock was a district (Bezirk) of East Germany. The administrative seat and the main town was Rostock.

History
The district was established, with the other 13, on 25 July 1952, substituting the old German states. After 3 October 1990 it was dissolved following German reunification, becoming again part of the state of Mecklenburg-Vorpommern.

Geography

Position
The Bezirk Rostock, the northernmost of DDR, was situated on the coast of the Baltic Sea, in front of the Danish coasts. It bordered with the Bezirke of Schwerin and Neubrandenburg. It bordered also with Poland and West Germany.

Subdivision
The Bezirk was divided into 14 Kreise: 4 urban districts (Stadtkreise) and 10 rural districts (Landkreise): 
Urban districts : Greifswald; Rostock; Stralsund; Wismar.
Rural districts : Bad Doberan; Greifswald; Grevesmühlen; Grimmen; Ribnitz-Damgarten; Rostock-Land; Rügen; Stralsund; Wismar; Wolgast.

References

External links

Rostock
Former states and territories of Mecklenburg-Western Pomerania
20th century in Mecklenburg-Western Pomerania
Rostock
Greifswald
Stralsund
Wismar